Rupel can be:

 Rupel is a river in Belgium 
 Rupel (ship), a gaff rigged wooden schooner (1992-1996) from the Netherlands
 Rupel Pass in Greece
 Rupel Fort in Greece

Rupel is also a Slovene surname:

 Anja Rupel, Slovene singer
 Dimitrij Rupel, Slovene politician